Onuphis may refer to:
  or Onouphis, archeological site in Ancient Egypt
 Onuphis (polychaete), a genus of polychaetes in the family Onuphidae